Tataltepec may refer to:

Tataltepec de Valdés, Oaxaca
Santa María Tataltepec, Oaxaca
Tataltepec Chatino language